Fumigaclavine B O-acetyltransferase (FgaAT) is an enzyme with systematic name acetyl-CoA:fumigaclavine B O-acetyltransferase. This enzyme catalyses the following chemical reaction

 acetyl-CoA + fumigaclavine B  CoA + fumigaclavine A

The enzyme participates in the biosynthesis of fumigaclavine C, an ergot alkaloid.

References

External links 
 

EC 2.3.1